Innisplain is a rural locality in the Scenic Rim Region, Queensland, Australia.

Geography 

Part of the Logan River and the Mount Lindesay Highway marks the western boundary.  The area is hilly with some land used for agriculture.  The Sydney–Brisbane rail corridor passes through the area, with the Mt Lindesay Highway crossing the interstate railway line at Innisplain.

History 
A railway station on the Beaudesert Shire Tramway was located at Innisplain, opening in 1903.  A state school operated from 1921 to 1962.

In 1877,  were resumed from the Telemon pastoral run and offered for selection on 17 April 1877.

Innisplain State School opened on 7 November 1921 and closed on 31 December 1962. It was on Innisplain Road.

The locality contains 40 households, in which 64.3% of the population are males and 35.7% of the population are females with a median age of 37, 1 year below the national average. The average weekly household income is $1,437, $1 below the national average.

Economy 
There are a number of homesteads in the locality:

 Innisplain
 Telemon
 Yaralla

Education 
There are no schools in Innisplain. The nearest government primary schools are Tamrookum State School in neighbouring Tamrookum to the north and Rathdowney State School in neighbouring Rathdowney to the south-west. The nearest government secondary school is Beaudesert State High School in Beaudesert to the north-east.

References

External links 

Scenic Rim Region
Localities in Queensland